Hughey Allen Woodle Sr. (1902–1962) was an American college football coach and agricultural agent. He served as the head football coach at Georgia Normal School—now known as Georgia Southern University–from 1927 to 1928, compiling a record of 11–6–1. Woodle later worked as a county agricultural agent for the Clemson University Extension Office, primarily out of Edgefield County, South Carolina.

Head coaching record

References

External links
 

1902 births
1962 deaths
Clemson University alumni
Georgia Southern Eagles football coaches